SMBA are initials that can refer to either:

St Mary's Bay Academy
Super Monkey Ball Adventure - A video game developed by Sega
San Marcos Baptist Academy - A coed prep school Baptist institution
UMP kinase, an enzyme